Stormy Weather is a 1935 British comedy film directed by Tom Walls and starring Walls, Ralph Lynn and Robertson Hare.

Plot
Sir Duncan Craggs retires from the Colonial Service and returns to London with his new French wife. The couple are devoted to each other, but continually flirt with other people. Sir Duncan is appointed to the board of clothing retail chain. On his tour of inspection, he encounters a successful store run by the efficient Mr. Bullock. By contrast, a neighbouring shop is filled with unhelpful staff overseen by an incompetent and lazy manager, Raymond Penny, who is more interested in horseracing than running his shop. Craggs is unimpressed by Penny and summons him to a meeting in London. Both Bullock and his domineering wife travel up to London as well, fearing that Penny will tell Craggs malicious stories about them.

Back in London, Mrs. Craggs is horrified to discover she is still married to the White Russian Count Polotsky, whom she had thought was dead. The villainous Polotsky plans to kidnap her and blackmail her new husband. Craggs, Penny and Bullock eventually rescue her from the Chinatown dive where she is being held. It is discovered that Polotsky has married a young Chinese woman and is equally guilty of bigamy. They are able to recover all incriminating evidence as well. In gratitude, Craggs appoints Penny as his assistant.

Cast

 Tom Walls as Sir Duncan Craggs 
 Ralph Lynn as Mr. Raymond Penny 
 Yvonne Arnaud as Louise Craggs 
 Robertson Hare as Mr. Bullock 
 Norma Varden as Mrs. Dulcie Bullock  
 Andrews Engelmann as Count Polotsky  
 Davy Burnaby as Merritt 
 Veronica Rose as Trixie Merritt  
 Stella Moya as Moya  
 Gordon James as Salt Jasper  
 Louis Bradfield as Lacey 
 Fewlass Llewellyn as Pullman 
 Peter Gawthorne as Police Inspector

Production
Stormy Weather is based on a story by Ben Travers. Since 1930, a popular series of film adaptations of Traver's Aldwych Farces had been released. Although the film was based on an original screenplay by Travers rather than one of his stage farces, it features a number of actors who had appeared in Aldwych films. The film was made by Gainsborough Pictures at Islington Studios. The film's sets were designed by art director Alex Vetchinsky.

References

Bibliography
 Cook, Pam. Gainsborough Pictures. Cassell, 1997. 
Low, Rachael. Filmmaking in 1930s Britain. George Allen & Unwin, 1985.
 Warren, Patricia. Elstree: The British Hollywood. Columbus Books, 1988.
Wood, Linda. British Films, 1927–1939. British Film Institute, 1986.

External links

1935 films
British comedy films
British black-and-white films
1935 comedy films
Films directed by Tom Walls
Islington Studios films
Films set in England
Films set in London
Films produced by Michael Balcon
Films scored by Jack Beaver
1930s English-language films
1930s British films